The following is a list of game controllers. It includes input devices that are notable and whose primary function is to control how the video games are played. Regional variants and models containing insignificant changes are not included.

Controllers

Mice
The following is a list of gaming mice, mice which are designed specifically to play games:

Notes

References
 
 

game controllers
game controllers